Marco Christian Flores Luján (born 29 May 1977 in Peru) is a Peruvian retired footballer.

Career

Despite playing for Club Alianza Lima, the second-most successful club in Peru, for two years, Flores only won one league title with them and won two titles with Club Deportivo Universidad de San Martín de Porres, the first in their history.

References

External links
 

1977 births
Living people
Peruvian footballers
Association football goalkeepers
Club Alianza Lima footballers
Sport Huancayo footballers
Peru international footballers